Tilag (also Romanized as Tīlag; also known as Neylak and Tīlak) is a village in Poshtkuh Rural District, in the Central District of Khash County, Sistan and Baluchestan Province, Iran. At the 2006 census, its population was 243, in 39 families.

References 

Populated places in Khash County